The 14th Ice Hockey World Championships and 25th European Championship was the first after the Second World War. It was held from 15 to 23 February 1947 at Štvanice Stadium in Prague, Czechoslovakia. Eight teams participated, but the competition was notably missing the reigning world champion, Canada. The world champion was decided for the first time by round robin league play. Czechoslovakia won the world championship for the first time and the European championship for the seventh time. King Gustav V had sent a telegram of congratulations to the Swedish team after beating the Czechoslovaks, but they had barely finished celebrating when they were upset by the Austrians, costing them the gold medal.

History
The 1947 congress of the Ligue Internationale de Hockey sur Glace (LIHG) was the first meeting or the organization since World War II. During the war, the Canadian Amateur Hockey Association (CAHA) united with the Amateur Hockey Association of the United States (AHAUS) to form the International Ice Hockey Association, and invited the British Ice Hockey Association to join. The new group was led by CAHA president W. G. Hardy, and was a means of shifting the control of world hockey from Europe to Canada.

The CAHA severed its ties to the LIHG in 1944, and pledged allegiance to the International Ice Hockey Association instead, and a closer relationship to AHAUS. The CAHA and AHAUS agreed in 1946 to propose a merger with the LIHG to oversee international ice hockey. The proposal sought for the Ice Hockey World Championships to alternate between Europe and North America, with the Olympic hockey tournaments played under the same rules as the CAHA and the National Hockey League. The CAHA attended the LIHG meeting during the 1947 championships, and pushed for the definition of amateur to be anyone not actively engaged in professional sport. The LIHG agreed to a merger where the presidency would alternate between North America and Europe every three years, and recognized AHAUS as the governing body of hockey in the United States instead of the Amateur Athletic Union. The CAHA was permitted to have its own definition of amateur as long as teams at the Olympic games adhered to existing LIHG rules.

Many notable changes were made to the rules for this championship. The game was standardized to be played in three 20 minute periods, aligning with the Canadian practice. The net size was standardized as well. There would be no more one- and three-minute penalties, and penalty shots were instituted.

Japan and Germany were barred from participation, but the LIHG was careful to illustrate that it was the politics, not the people, who were at fault, and allies like Austria and Italy were admitted.

1947 World Ice Hockey Championships (Prague, Czechoslovakia)

Game results

Final standings 

World Champion 1947
 Czechoslovakia

Team members

Final rankings -- European Championship 

1947 European Champion
 Czechoslovakia

Citations

References
Complete results

IIHF Men's World Ice Hockey Championships
International ice hockey competitions hosted by Czechoslovakia
1946–47 in Czechoslovak ice hockey
February 1947 sports events in Europe
Sports competitions in Prague
1940s in Prague